Siegfried Olesch is a German lightweight boxer who won the bronze medal at the 1963 European Amateur Boxing Championships. He competed for the SC Dynamo Berlin / Sportvereinigung (SV) Dynamo.

References 

Light-heavyweight boxers
Living people
German male boxers
Year of birth missing (living people)